Motomu (written:  or ) is a masculine Japanese given name. Notable people with the name include:

, Japanese actor and voice actor
, Japanese actor and voice actor
, Japanese video game director

Japanese masculine given names